This article lists the winners and nominees for the Black Reel Award for Television for Outstanding Supporting Actress, Drama Series. This category was first introduced in 2017 and won by Thandiwe Newton for Westworld. Susan Kelechi Watson is has the most wins in this category with 3.

Winners and nominees
Winners are listed first and highlighted in bold.

2010s

2020s

Superlatives

Programs with multiple awards

3 awards
 Westworld

2 awards
 This Is Us

Performers with multiple awards

3 awards
 Susan Kelechi Watson (2 consecutive)

2 awards
 Thandiwe Newton

Programs with multiple nominations

5 nominations
 This Is Us

4 nominations
 Westworld

2 nominations
 Bridgerton
 Greenleaf
 Lovecraft Country
 Queen Sugar

Performers with multiple nominations

5 nominations
 Susan Kelechi Watson

3 nominations 
 Thandiwe Newton

2 nominations
 Adjoa Andoh
 Lynn Whitfield

Total awards by network
 NBC - 3
 HBO - 2
 Netflix - 1

References

Black Reel Awards